Hubert Schrott (born 4 May 1935) is an Austrian cross-country skier. He competed in the men's 15 kilometre event at the 1964 Winter Olympics.

References

External links
 

1935 births
Living people
Austrian male cross-country skiers
Olympic cross-country skiers of Austria
Cross-country skiers at the 1964 Winter Olympics
People from Villanders
Sportspeople from Südtirol
20th-century Austrian people